Khampat (ခမ်းပါတ်မြို့) is a town in the Sagaing Region in western Myanmar. The town has about 40,000 inhabitants.

Khampat Settlement

Khampat in the Kabaw valley is claimed to be the first town of the Zou (Chin-Kuki-Mizo) race. Khampat in the Chin Hills was historically associated with the Zou settlement and this might possibly be taken as an early reference to a Zou chief. The settlement at Khampat is believed to have lasted for about two centuries. The dispersal from Khampat is said to be due to famine and invasion of stronger enemy, possibly the Shans.

References
See: A History of the Zou People, page-108, published by United Zou Organization-India Publication.
First Published 2017
©2017 David Vumlallian Zou & S. Thangboi Zou for Introduction and Editorial Matters.

External links 
 Khampat;collinsmaps.com
to Zolawkta Website

Populated places in Sagaing Region